Sir Hugh Stewart, 2nd Baronet (14 May 1792 – 19 November 1854)
 was a Tory politician in Ireland.

He was High Sheriff of Tyrone for 1827 and was member of parliament for Tyrone from 1830 to 1835.

Stewart lived at Ballygawley House, Co. Tyrone.

In 1837, he married Elizabeth St. George, daughter of Rev. Henry Lucas St. George, of Co. Tyrone. Lady Stewart died aged 87 at her residence, Sandford Lodge, Ranelagh, on 2 September 1902.

References

External links 
 

1792 births
1854 deaths
Members of the Parliament of the United Kingdom for County Tyrone constituencies (1801–1922)
Tory MPs (pre-1834)
Irish Conservative Party MPs
UK MPs 1830–1831
UK MPs 1831–1832
UK MPs 1832–1835
Baronets in the Baronetage of the United Kingdom
People from County Tyrone
High Sheriffs of Tyrone